HMS Campbeltown was a  destroyer of the Royal Navy during the Second World War. She was originally US destroyer , and was one of 50 obsolescent U.S. Navy destroyers transferred to the Royal Navy in 1940 as part of the Destroyers for Bases Agreement. Campbeltown became one of the most famous of these ships when she was used in the St Nazaire Raid in 1942.

Service history

As USS Buchanan

USS Buchanan was a  destroyer, ordered from the Bath Iron Works, Bath, Maine, and laid down on 29 June 1918. She was launched on 2 January 1919 and commissioned into the Navy on 20 January. She had a typical inter-war career, and was placed into the reserve in 1939. She then became one of 50 destroyers transferred to the Royal Navy in 1940 after the finalisation of the Destroyers for Bases Agreement. She was transferred on 3 September 1940 and commissioned on 9 September at Halifax, Canada.

As HMS Campbeltown
Having been formally commissioned she took passage from Halifax to Plymouth, travelling via St John's, Newfoundland. She arrived at Devonport Dockyard on 29 September and was taken in hand for modifications to fit her for service with the Royal Navy. The refits lasted throughout October, and on completion of the final harbour trials on 1 November she was nominated to join the 17th Flotilla operating in the Western Approaches. The next day, while carrying out sea trials she collided with SS Risoy and sustained damage, but continued and arrived safely at Liverpool, where she underwent repairs from 7 to 24 November. She then joined the flotilla.

On 29 November, she ran down and sank the British coaster  in the Mersey Estuary. She began deploying with the flotilla in early December, but on 3 December she collided with SS Comus and had to put into port for repairs again. The repairs lasted until late March, and involved the shortening of the fourth funnel.

On completion of the work on 28 March, Campbeltown was transferred on loan to the Royal Netherlands Navy as HNLMS Campbeltown, where she joined the 7th Escort Group and deployed with them in April–May. The Dutch proposed to rename her Middelburg, but this was not agreed as it would have been contrary to the naming agreed with the U.S. Navy. She underwent further repairs throughout June and resumed convoy defence with the group in July–August. She was then nominated to be returned to the Royal Navy in September, but remained with the 7th Escort Group. She spent September working up with her Royal Navy crew and rejoined the group in October, where she covered convoys between Britain and West Africa. On 15 September she picked up the survivors of the Norwegian motor tanker Vinga, which had been damaged in an enemy air attack. She carried out escort duties in November–December, before taking passage to Devonport to undergo repairs.

The St Nazaire Raid

Campbeltown began the Devonport repairs in January. During this time, she was selected for a special operation and was withdrawn from regular service for modifications. She was to be used in Operation Chariot, a planned assault operation on the docks at Saint-Nazaire. In 1942 the German battleship —anchored at Trondheim in Norway—was considered to present a grave threat to Atlantic convoys. Should Tirpitz enter the Atlantic, the Louis Joubert drydock at Saint-Nazaire—which had originally been built for the liner —was a vital target; it was the only German-held drydock on the European coast of the Atlantic that was large enough to service the battleship. If this drydock could be put out of action, any offensive sortie by Tirpitz into the Atlantic would be much more dangerous for the Kriegsmarine to carry out, making it less likely that they would risk deploying her.

Operation Chariot was a plan to ram an explosive-laden warship into the dock gates. Accompanying her would be a number of small boats carrying British Commandos, who would destroy the dock's pumping and winding machinery and other infrastructure. The troops would then be evacuated by the small boats before the explosives in the ship detonated. A particular difficulty was that the dock was located several miles up the estuary of the Loire River. As an obsolescent destroyer, Campbeltown was considered to be expendable and was selected to be the ram-ship. She spent February undergoing modifications. These included removing her third and fourth funnels and having the remaining two funnels raked to simulate the structure and appearance of a German Raubvogel-class torpedo boat. A 12-pounder gun was installed forward and eight  Oerlikon anti-aircraft cannon were mounted on the upper deck. Some extra armour was provided to protect the bridge structure, and unnecessary stores and equipment were removed to lighten the destroyer.

The charges were to be detonated by multiple eight-hour time pencils connected together by cordtex, set before steaming out and cemented in to prevent any interference with the detonation. Campbeltown steamed from Devonport to Falmouth, Cornwall on 25 March to join the other ships that would take part in the operation. The crew—which would be evacuated with the commandos—was reduced to 75 men, under the command of Lieutenant-Commander Stephen "Sam" Beattie.

A flotilla of 21 vessels—Campbeltown, 16 Fairmile B motor launches, one motor torpedo boat and a Fairmile C motor gun boat acting as the troops' headquarters—left Falmouth at 14:00 on 26 March 1942, escorted for most of the crossing to France by two Hunt-class escort destroyers. One motor launch suffered mechanical problems and had to return to England.

The preliminary air raid carried out through heavy cloud by 35 Armstrong Whitworth Whitleys and 25 Vickers Wellingtons was much smaller than originally planned and was ineffective, merely alerting the defenders of something unusual happening. Campbeltown—as the largest target—drew most of the fire. During the final approach, the crew of Campbeltown lowered the emblem of the Kriegsmarine and hoisted the fighting ensign of the Royal Navy.

At 01:34 on 28 March, four minutes later than planned, Campbeltown rammed the dock gate. The Commandos and ship's crew came ashore under heavy German fire and set about demolishing the dock machinery. 169 of the raiders were killed (64 commandos and 105 sailors) out of the 611 men in the attacking force. Of the survivors, 215 were captured and 222 were evacuated by the surviving small craft. A further five evaded capture and travelled overland through France to Spain and then to Gibraltar, a British territory.

The charges in Campbeltown exploded at noon, an hour and a half later than the British had expected. Although the ship had been searched by the Germans, the explosives had not been detected. The explosion killed around 250 German soldiers and French civilians and demolished both the front half of the destroyer and the  caisson of the drydock, with the rush of water into the drydock washing the remains of the ship into it. The Saint-Nazaire drydock was rendered unusable for the rest of the war and was not repaired until 1948.

The delayed-action torpedoes fired by the motor torpedo boat into the outer lock gate to the submarine basin detonated, as planned, on the night of 30 March. This later explosion led to panic, with German forces firing on French civilians and on each other. Sixteen French civilians were killed and around thirty wounded. Later, 1,500 civilians were arrested and interned in a camp at Savenay and most of their houses were demolished, even though they had had nothing to do with the raid. Lt-Cdr Beattie—who was taken prisoner—received the Victoria Cross for his valour and in 1947 received the French Légion d'honneur. His Victoria Cross was one of five that were awarded to participants in the raid, along with 80 other military decorations.

Legacy
The ship's bell of HMS Campbeltown was given to the town of Campbelltown, Pennsylvania, as a gesture of appreciation towards the United States for the Destroyers for Bases Agreement program. This ship's bell was later lent by the town to the subsequent , a Type 22 frigate, when she was commissioned in 1989 and was returned on 21 June 2011 after HMS Campbeltown was decommissioned.

The 1952 film The Gift Horse was loosely based on the story of HMS Campbeltown.

Footnotes

References

 

Ships built in Bath, Maine
1919 ships
Ships transferred from the United States Navy to the Royal Navy
Town-class destroyers of the Royal Navy
Town-class destroyers converted from Wickes-class destroyers
World War II destroyers of the United Kingdom
Ships transferred from the United States Navy to the Royal Netherlands Navy
Town-class destroyers of the Royal Netherlands Navy
World War II destroyers of the Netherlands
Shipwrecks in the Bay of Biscay
World War II shipwrecks in the Atlantic Ocean
Maritime incidents in March 1942